Volodymyr Shesterov (born 16 January 1954) is a Soviet long-distance runner. He competed in the men's 10,000 metres at the 1980 Summer Olympics.

References

1954 births
Living people
Athletes (track and field) at the 1980 Summer Olympics
Soviet male long-distance runners
Olympic athletes of the Soviet Union
Place of birth missing (living people)